Samuel or Sammy Sharp may refer to:

Samuel Sharp (surgeon) (1700?–1778), British surgeon and author, of Jamaican birth
Sammy Sharp, 1920s footballer who played for Manchester City
Sam Sharp, 1973 co-founder of Loaf 'N Jug convenience stores

See also
Samuel Sharpe (disambiguation)